Daniel Tibbets is an American media executive.  He is the president and general manager of the El Rey Network, a position he has held since  May 2016. 

Tibbets was an early advocate of media produced specifically for cell phone distribution. As the head of the experimental Fox Lab at Twentieth Television, he created the first mobisodes, Love and Hate, and Sunset Hotel. He has held senior positions at Machinima, Bunim/Murray Productions, and GoTV Networks. He was appointed by Smosh as its first CEO as he has a fluency in all aspects of entertainment, expected to broaden its brand to "traditional media".

References

External links

American chief executives in the media industry
American businesspeople in mass media
American television executives
Living people
University of Arizona alumni
Year of birth missing (living people)